The sandstone shrikethrush (Colluricincla woodwardi) is a species of bird in the family Pachycephalidae.
It is endemic to Australia. Alternate names for the sandstone shrikethrush include the brown-breasted shrike-thrush and sandstone thrush.

References

sandstone shrikethrush
Birds of the Northern Territory
Endemic birds of Australia
sandstone shrikethrush
Taxonomy articles created by Polbot